Kulja is a small town in the Wheatbelt region of Western Australia. The town is situated along the Bonnie Rock to Burakin Road.

The area was charted in 1908 and the Indigenous Australian name of a local soak was recorded as Kulja.
The townsite was originally established in the late 1920s as part of a railway siding on the Ejanding North Railway line. 
The townsite was gazetted in 1928 once a large enough local population had settled in the area.

The surrounding areas produce wheat and other cereal crops. The town is a receival site for Cooperative Bulk Handling.

History
Kulja had a post office between 1928 and 1973. There was also a post office called Kulja Railway Construction between 1929 and 1931.

In 1932 the Wheat Pool of Western Australia announced that the town would have two grain elevators, each fitted with an engine, installed at the railway siding.

References

External links 

Wheatbelt (Western Australia)
Grain receival points of Western Australia
Populated places established in 1928